Phryxe nemea is a species of fly in the family Tachinidae.

Distribution
Palearctic.
.

References

Diptera of Europe
Diptera of Asia
Exoristinae
Insects described in 1824
Taxa named by Johann Wilhelm Meigen